The 2011 Wilmington Hammerheads season, is the club's 16th season in existence, and their second-consecutive year playing in the third division of American soccer, following a hiatus in 2009. This year marks the club's debut in the newly created USL Pro League.

Review and events 
The club was on a hiatus in 2010, and returned to fielding a professional side this year. They joined the USL Pro, and were allocated into the National Division, which primarily consisted of Southern clubs.

The club signed four players from Ventura County Fusion on March 2, 2011: Dylan Riley, Ivan Becerra, Manny Guzman, and Jack Avesyan.

Match results

Legend

USL Pro

U.S. Open Cup

Club

Roster 
As of June 10, 2011.

Management and staff 

  David Irving - Head Coach/Director of Soccer Operations
  Roxanne DeMonte - Game Day Operations

League standings

American Division

Statistics 
{|| class="wikitable sortable"
|-
!
!
!Player
!
!
!
!
!
!
!
!Acquired
!Salary
|- align=center
| ||2 ||align=left data-sort-value="Harvey" | Jordan Harvey
|DF ||15 ||15 ||0 ||1 ||3 ||1 ||align=left|Expansion Draft||$63,125

Transfers

In

Awards 
None.

See also 
 2011 USL Pro season
 2011 U.S. Open Cup
 2011 in American soccer
 Wilmington Hammerheads

References 

Wilmington Hammerheads FC seasons
American soccer clubs 2011 season
2011 USL Pro season
2011 in sports in North Carolina